Cristina Guzmán may refer to:

 Cristina Guzmán (novel), a 1936 novel by Carmen de Icaza
 Cristina Guzmán (1943 film), a Spanish film adaptation directed by Gonzalo Delgrás 
 Cristina Guzmán (telenovela), a 1966 Mexican television series
 Cristina Guzmán (1968 film), a Spanish film adaptation directed by Luis César Amadori